Elstow is a civil parish in Bedford, Bedfordshire, England. It contains 31 listed buildings that are recorded in the National Heritage List for England.  Of these, three are listed at Grade I, two are listed at Grade II*, the middle of the three grades, and the others are at Grade II, the lowest grade. The parish adjoins the large town of Bedford.  Almost all the listed buildings are houses.  Also listed are a church, a  moot hall, two public houses and the ruined Hillersdon mansion.

Key

Buildings

References

Lists of listed buildings in Bedfordshire
Listed buildings in the Borough of Bedford